Gabriel Weimann is a Professor of Communications at the University of Haifa and a former fellow at the Woodrow Wilson International Center for Scholars.  Weimann is known for having begun to track and study terrorist web sites in the mid 1990s, "long before most analysts were aware of the problem."
His papers and research reports (7 monographs and more than 180 publications), have been published in scientific journals and books. He received numerous grants and awards from international foundations and was a Visiting Professor at various universities including University of Pennsylvania, Stanford University, Hofstra University, American University DC, University of Maryland, Lehigh University (USA), University of Mainz and LMU University of Munich (Germany), Carleton University (Canada) and the National University of Singapore.

Books
Hate on Trial: The Zundel Case, the Media and Public Opinion in Canada; co-author Conrad Winn, (1986) Toronto: Mosaic Press, Canada, 201 pp.
The Theater of Terror: The Mass Media and International Terrorism, co-author Conrad Winn, (1993) New York: Longman Publishing/Addison-Wesley, 295 pp.
The Influentials: People Who Influence People, (1994) New York: State University of New York Press (SUNY), 380 pp.
Communicating Unreality: Mass Media and Reconstruction of Realities, (2000) Los Angeles: Sage Publications. 440 pp.
The Singaporean Enigma, co-author Baruch Nevo, (2001) Jerusalem: Zivonim, 248 pp. (H).
Terror on the Internet: The New Arena, (2006) The New Challenges. Washington, DC: United States Institute of Peace Press., 309 pp.  James Fallows of The Atlantic calls Terror on the Internet, an "influential" book.
Freedom and Terror: Reason and Unreason in Politics, co-author Abraham Kaplan (2011), Abraham London: Routledge, 189 pp.
Social Research for Democracy: The Story of the Israeli Institute of Applied Social Research. (2015) Jerusalem: Zivonim (forthcoming) (H).
Terror in Cyberspace: The Next Generation, (2015) New York: Columbia University Press.

References

External links
Website

Year of birth missing (living people)
Living people
Academic staff of the University of Haifa